William Kipkorir is a Kenyan politician. He belongs to  UDA party and was elected to represent the Baringo County in the Senate of Kenya since the 2022 General election. He managed to win against Gideon Moi. He is a former member of parliament for Baringo North.

References

Living people
Year of birth missing (living people)
Orange Democratic Movement politicians
Members of the National Assembly (Kenya)
Place of birth missing (living people)
People from Baringo County
Members of the 10th Parliament of Kenya
Members of the 11th Parliament of Kenya
Members of the 12th Parliament of Kenya